Eldgarnsö Nature Reserve is a nature reserve in Stockholm County in Sweden.

Eldgarnsö Nature Reserve consists of Eldgarnsö island in Lake Mälaren. A  trail runs around the island. The nature reserve consists of on the one hand an area of broad-leaf forest, and on the other of an area which is more mixed, containing arable land, coniferous forest and beach meadows with shallow water overgrown with reeds.

Flora
The broad-leaf forest is dominated by oak, European ash and wych elm. Mistletoe grows among the trees; this parasite is uncommon in Sweden (and hence a protected species) due to the cool climate, but survives in local areas of warmer micro-climate such as Eldgarnsö island. In the open meadows, solitary oak trees rise above stands of unspotted lungwort, Cardamine bulbifera, spring vetchling and black pea.

Fauna
The island has a rich bird-life. Species include the European honey buzzard, Eurasian wryneck and ortolan bunting. The nature reserve also supports a rich variety of insects.

References

Nature reserves in Sweden
Geography of Stockholm County
Protected areas established in 1979
1979 establishments in Sweden
Tourist attractions in Stockholm County